Rafael "Hideo" Suzuki (born August 13, 1987 in São Paulo, Brazil) is a Japanese born Brazilian racing driver. He has competed in several Formula Three series before the All-Japan Formula Three Championship, such as the South American, Asian and the German Formula Three Championship.

Career

1998 - Go-Kart 
After a few indoor go-kart races, Rafael Suzuki started to compete at the age of 10 in 1998, and soon went to some wins and titles, building a successful career.

Racing record

Career summary

Complete Stock Car Brasil results

References

External links
 
 

1987 births
Living people
Brazilian people of Japanese descent
Brazilian racing drivers
Racing drivers from São Paulo
Formula 3 Sudamericana drivers
Asian Formula Three Championship drivers
German Formula Three Championship drivers
Japanese Formula 3 Championship drivers
Auto GP drivers
International GT Open drivers
Stock Car Brasil drivers
Karting World Championship drivers
Performance Racing drivers
TOM'S drivers
Ombra Racing drivers
Bhaitech drivers
24H Series drivers